Molan is a surname. Notable persons with the surname include:

 Con Molan (1886–1969), Australian rules footballer
 Erin Molan (born 1984), Australian radio and television presenter
 Jim Molan (1950–2023), Australian politician and former major general in the Australian Army
 Peter Molan (1943–2015), New Zealand biochemist
 Stan Molan (1893–1943), Australian rules footballer